Brissopsis alta is a species of sea urchins of the family Brissidae. Their armour is covered with spines. Brissopsis alta was first scientifically described in 1907 by Ole Mortensen.

References

Animals described in 1907
alta
Taxa named by Ole Theodor Jensen Mortensen